Avoid One Thing is the debut album by the band of the same name. It was released in 2002 (see 2002 in music).

The Bouncing Souls released a cover of "Lean on Sheena" as a single from their album The Gold Record.

Track listing
All songs by Joe Gittleman.
"Yakisoba" – 3:15
"Backyard Joey" – 2:40
"Lean on Sheena" – 3:04
"Pulse and Picture" – 2:43
"Every Second of Every Day" – 2:38
"Take a Good Look" – 3:01
"Rip It Up It's There" – 2:58
"Bomb-Building Songs" – 3:00
"Next Stop Batteries" – 2:23
"Slip 78" – 2:48
"Saturday" – 3:15

Personnel
 Joe Gittleman - lead vocals, bass, producer
 Paul Delano - guitar, vocals
 Amy Griffin - guitar, vocals
 Dave Karcich - drums
 Tom Polce - additional musician
 Eric Fontana - additional musician
 Rob Pemberton - engineer
 Matt Ferarra - assistant engineer
 Paul Q. Kolderie - additional production
 Carl Plaster - additional production
 Jeff Lipton - mastering
 Andrew Lenoski - Gatefold design
 Len Gittleman - cover art
 Trish Miller - photography
 Jay Hale - photography
 Amy Archer - photography

References

2002 debut albums
Avoid One Thing albums
SideOneDummy Records albums